WISEPC J140518.40+553421.4 (abbreviated WISE 1405+5534) is a brown dwarf of spectral class Y0 (pec?), located in constellation Ursa Major at approximately 25.3 light-years from Earth. It is one of the Sun's nearest neighbors.

Discovery
WISE 1405+5534 was discovered in 2011 from data collected by the Wide-field Infrared Survey Explorer (WISE) in the infrared at a wavelength of 40 cm (16 in). WISE 1405+5534 has two discovery papers: Kirkpatrick et al. (2011) and Cushing et al. (2011), however, basically with the same authors and published nearly simultaneously.

Kirkpatrick et al. presented discovery of 98 new found by WISE brown dwarf systems with components of spectral types M, L, T and Y, among which also was WISE 1405+5534.
Cushing et al. presented discovery of seven brown dwarfs—one of T9.5 type, and six of Y-type—first members of the Y spectral class, ever discovered and spectroscopically confirmed, including "archetypal member" of the Y spectral class WISE 1828+2650, and WISE 1405+5534. These seven objects are also the faintest seven of 98 brown dwarfs, presented in Kirkpatrick et al. (2011).

Distance
Currently the most accurate distance estimate of WISE 1405+5534 is a trigonometric parallax, measured using Spitzer Space Telescope and published in 2013 by Trent Dupuy and Adam Kraus: 0.129 ± 0.019 arcsec, corresponding to a distance 7.8 pc, or 25.3 ly.

WISE 1405+5534 distance estimates

Non-trigonometric distance estimates are marked in italic. The most precise estimate is marked in bold.

Space motion
WISE 1405+5534 has a large proper motion of about 2281 milliarcseconds per year.

WISE 1405+5534 proper motion estimates

The most accurate estimates are marked in bold.

Spectral class and temperature
The object's temperature estimate is 350 K  (about 77 °C / 170 °F). Its spectrum is similar with spectrum of another Y-dwarf WISE 1738+2732. However, WISE 1405+5534's spectrum has a red shift of H-band flux peak, suggesting that WISE 1405+5534 may be peculiar, therefore it is classified as Y0 (pec?).

See also
 List of star systems within 25–30 light-years
WISE 0148-7202 (T9.5)
WISE 0410+1502 (Y0)
WISE 1541-2250 (Y0.5)
WISE 1738+2732 (Y0)
WISE 1828+2650 (≥Y2)
WISE 2056+1459 (Y0)

Notes

References

Brown dwarfs
Y-type stars
Ursa Major (constellation)
20110901
WISE objects